Lakh Bahosi Sanctuary is a bird sanctuary spread over two jheels (shallow lakes) near the villages of Lakh and Bahosi (abt 4 km apart) in Kannauj district, Uttar Pradesh, India.  It is about 40 km from Kannauj.  Primarily a bird sanctuary, species from 49 genera (of the 97 inhabiting India) can be seen at the sanctuary.  It is one of the largest bird sanctuary in India, covering 80 km2 including also a stretch of the Upper Ganges canal.  (Lat/Long: 26°54'47.50"N 79°39'19.20")

Getting there
Lakh-Bahosi is 5 km from Indergarh Police Station.  It is about 35 km from 
Kannauj , bus stand on the Grand Trunk Road (NH91) - the road turns right at the canal just past Tirwa (10 km distant from tirwa)(abt 15 km from Kannauj).  It's about 90 km from Kanpur and 125 km and 3 hours drive from Kanpur Airport.

Attraction
Spread over 3 km2 beside the Bahosi Lake, the sanctuary is home to various migratory birds from November to March. Jackal, blue bull, mongoose, fishing cat and monkeys may also be spotted here.

A separate lake at nearby Lakh village hosts some similar species, though the relative ecology is somewhat different. 

The best time to visit is December to February.

External links 
 bumpy trail bicycling to lakh-bahosi (feb 27-28 2010)
 World Database on Protected Areas

Bird sanctuaries of Uttar Pradesh
Kannauj district
Protected areas with year of establishment missing